Denis Gaté (born 5 March 1958) is a French rower. He competed at the 1980 Summer Olympics and the 1984 Summer Olympics.

References

1958 births
Living people
French male rowers
Olympic rowers of France
Rowers at the 1980 Summer Olympics
Rowers at the 1984 Summer Olympics
Place of birth missing (living people)